The X Wrestling Federation (XWF) (later referred to as the Xcitement Wrestling Federation) was an  American professional wrestling promotion that operated from 2001 to 2002. 

The previous number two and three American promotions, World Championship Wrestling and Extreme Championship Wrestling, had folded earlier in 2001, leaving only one national wrestling company. As such, the letter "X" in XWF stood for the missing variable in the sport. The official definition of the "X" became Xcitement as cited by "Mean" Gene Okerlund in the Extras on the XWF DVD and not "Xtreme" as sometimes written.

History

Formation
The idea of the XWF was generated when Kevin Harrington pitched the idea of replacing the then-AOL Time Warner owned World Championship Wrestling, which was just purchased by rival competitor the World Wrestling Federation. He suggested this plan to several wrestling superstars at the time, including Hulk Hogan, Jimmy Hart, The Nasty Boys, and Greg Valentine. These conversations led to the X Wrestling Federation coming together and Hart becoming the President of the company.

The basis of the XWF was to create a wrestling promotion showcasing family-friendly entertainment, all while displaying the talents of past legends and future superstars, similar to the format that was used on WCW Saturday Night and WCW Main Event. The intent was to create a PG-style of wrestling that was similar to what WCW presented before the nWo was formed. It would also give the wrestlers another place to work, since the WWF had become the only nationally televised wrestling organization.

TV tapings

The initial XWF tapings were conducted in November 2001 at Universal Studios in Orlando, Florida, in the soundstage that used to be the home for the WCW Worldwide Wrestling tapings, and later the home for IMPACT! Wrestling's TV tapings. Former WCW play-by-play announcer Tony Schiavone and former WWF color commentator Jerry Lawler were brought in to call the matches. Lawler had left the WWF earlier in the year, in protest, after he felt they had unfairly fired his then-wife Stacy Carter. Shortly after the tapings, Lawler and Carter divorced, he mended fences with the WWF, and asked the XWF to be let out of his contract so that he could return there. They also brought in Mean Gene Okerlund to be their locker room interviewer. The storylines were based on a struggle for power in the company between Rena Mero (formerly Sable in the WWF), who was the heel CEO, and Rowdy Roddy Piper, the babyface commissioner. The XWF Roster was a mixture of former WWF, WCW, and ECW Stars, as well as several indy stars. They brought in Hulk Hogan, with the hope that he would be both a wrestler and a part owner of the company. He would then wrestle and defeat Curt Hennig (who was accompanied by his "agent" Bobby Heenan) in his only match at the tapings. In addition to Hogan and Hennig other stars included; Vampiro, Buff Bagwell, A.J. Styles, Christopher Daniels, the Nasty Boys, Hacksaw Jim Duggan, Jimmy Snuka Jr. (managed by Jimmy Snuka Sr.), Marty Jannetty, Greg Valentine, Horace Hogan, Ryan Sakoda (who wrestled as Vapor and was managed by Sonny Onoo), Low Ki (who wrestled as Quick Kick), Kid Kash, Juventud Guerrera, Psicosis, Konnan, Carly Colón (who was accompanied by Carlos Colón, Sr.), Maximum Force (Simon and Swinger, who were managed by Dawn Marie), Johnny B. Badd, Norman Smiley, the KISS Demon (managed by Gene Simmons), Devon Storm (Crowbar in WCW), Big Vito, the Road Warriors, Public Enemy (who wrestled as the South Philly Posse), the Shane Twins, Josh Matthews, and Emory Hail (The Machine in WCW; managed by Jimmy Hart). Ten episodes were taped, and prepared for broadcast. The talents were only signed for the initial set of tapings. Shortly after the tapings, WWF owner Vince McMahon poached several of their key talents such as Lawler, Hogan, Hennig, Piper, and others. Hart expressed his frustration in an interview. He explained that they would go to network executives to pitch the show. The executives would get excited by the roster, but Hart and company would then have to explain that several talents were no longer with the XWF and had gone to the WWF. They would then get turned down.

During the tapings, a joint angle was worked with the Puerto Rico-based World Wrestling Council (WWC) which began by having Ray González appear backstage speaking to Hogan, Bagwell and other talents in an effort to have them join his La Familia del Milenio stable. This was worked along WAPA-TV, which produced a prime time special titled XWF vs. WWC: Invasión, but the angle was heavily modified since it featured the reduced roster and González left for the IWA-PR. More cards were co-promoted, with WWC ultimately winning a series where the only consequential outcome was a title change of the XWF World Tag Team Championship.

House shows
Following the initial tapings held in fall 2001, the XWF held their first three shows in Hammond, Indiana; Milwaukee, Wisconsin; and Green Bay, Wisconsin. In Spring 2002 the promotion ran more shows, and a series of house shows in Texas. In addition to the wrestlers that stayed on, the XWF brought in Rey Mysterio, who teamed with his longtime friend Konnan against the Nasty Boys, and hardcore legend Terry Funk, who wrestled Greg Valentine. The XWF scheduled a second series of house shows in Michigan, but ultimately had to cancel them due to low ticket sales. After not being able to secure a television deal, the promotion later folded.

Jimmy Hart era
Jimmy Hart acquired the rights for the XWF for an undetermined amount in 2004. In September 2004, the idea of bringing a special television series about the XWF to The Wrestling Channel and likely other channels thereafter was explored by Hart. The collaboration with WWC was briefly revived during this time. During July 2005, the XWF released a three DVD series called In Your Face: The Lost Episodes of the XWF. It featured 19 matches from the original Universal Studios tapings with extras including an interview with Hulk Hogan. The series is hosted by Jimmy Hart and Brian Knobs. They also broadcast a series of pay-per-views on DISH Network featuring matches from the tapings.

Redesign
In November 2008 the XWF re-launched its wrestling website displaying the new logo. In January 2009 it was rumored that there were talks of a possible pay-per-view similar to how Total Nonstop Action and Ring of Honor received their television deals. Also, footage from the XWF "invasion" of WWC in 2002 was to be released. Additionally, plans were underway to launch a series of matches featuring living legends from 2001, new up and coming talent, as well as having living remaining members make personal appearances for the XWF. A Special Collectors set including a DVD, T-shirt, autographs, and an actual piece of the ring apron from the 2001 tapings was expected to be released later in 2009.

As of 2023, no further activity from the relaunched XWF has taken place, and the website has been taken down.

Championship Titles and Wrestling Style
XWF’s wrestling style was to encompass Sports Entertainment, Rasslin, Puroresu and Lucha Libre, as many of the talent signed to the federation trained primarily in each or all of these styles of wrestling.

The XWF held four distinctive wrestling divisions with titles for each: The XWF Heavyweight Championship, the XWF Tag Team Championship, the XWF Cruiserweight Championship and the XWF Women’s Championship. Talks of a 5th championship were rumored and, if created, would have been a mid-card title similar to World Wrestling Entertainment’s Intercontinental and United States Championships or Impact Wrestling’s Television Championship.

XWF champions

Notes

References
 XWF News and Articles by XWF news editor Peter Clapsis. (first published in November 2008).
 XWF Taping Results
 XWF Releases Roster published November 2001 credited to Jon Waldman at SLAM! Wrestling

Entertainment companies established in 2001
American companies established in 2001
Companies disestablished in 2002
Independent professional wrestling promotions based in Florida
Privately held companies based in Florida